Verkhnyaya Kichuga is a rural locality (a village) in Opokskoye Rural Settlement, Velikoustyugsky District, Vologda Oblast, Russia. The population was 87 as of 2002.

Geography 
Verkhnyaya Kichuga is located 52 km southwest of Veliky Ustyug (the district's administrative centre) by road. Kichuga is the nearest rural locality.

References 

Rural localities in Velikoustyugsky District